The Exhibition Cup was a one-off football tournament contested in Glasgow, Scotland. Held to coincide with the International Exhibition of Science, Art and Industry, this early season competition was won by Cowlairs, beating Celtic in the final. The matches, played over the month of August 1888 with the final on 6 September, were staged at the University of Glasgow recreation grounds at Gilmorehill (today occupied by various departments of the institution such as the Kelvin Building of Physics and the Graham Kerr Building of Zoology), close to the exhibition's main site at Kelvingrove. While the tournament winners were awarded a handsome trophy, the runners up were presented with gold badges.

Although the Scottish Football League had yet to be formed, the Exhibition Cup could be considered something of a second-tier tournament, as none of the entrants had been a winner or finalist in the Scottish Cup in its first 15 years of existence. However the tournament has some historical significance for Celtic, as it was the first final the club played, having only formed a few months earlier, and their first ever defeat. The result was seen as a surprise, as Celtic had assembled a strong team of experienced players, mostly with Irish connections, from Hibernian and Renton, although Cowlairs also boosted their squad with guest players. The two teams met again a few weeks later in the second round of the 1888–89 Scottish Cup, Celtic this time winning emphatically 8–0, and went on to the final, losing to Third Lanark. Celtic also progressed to the final of the 1889 Glasgow North Eastern Cup, where they gained further revenge on Cowlairs by defeating them 6–1 to win their first trophy.

Matches

First round

Replays

Quarter-finals

Replays

Semi-finals

Final

|}

See also
Glasgow International Exhibition Cup, similar tournament in 1901 at the same venue
Edinburgh Exhibition Cup, similar tournament in 1908
Empire Exhibition Trophy, similar tournament in 1938 (also featuring English clubs)
Saint Mungo Cup, similar tournament in 1951
Coronation Cup (football), similar tournament in 1953 (also featuring English clubs)

References

Defunct football cup competitions in Scotland
Scottish football friendly trophies
1888–89 in Scottish football